Roger Greene may refer to:

Roger Sherman Greene (1840–1930), US lawyer and judge
Roger Sherman Greene II (1881–1947), US diplomat
Roger A. Greene (1887–?), American college football player and coach
Roger L. Greene, professor at Palo Alto University

See also
Roger Green (disambiguation)